HGO may refer to:
 HGO Trust (formerly Hampstead Garden Opera), in London
 Houston Grand Opera, in Houston, Texas, United States
 Mercury(II) oxide (chemical symbol HgO)
 Héctor Germán Oesterheld (1919–1977), Argentine science fiction and comics writer, popularly known by his initials HGO
 Korhogo Airport in Côte d'Ivoire (IATA code HGO)
 Högskolan på Gotland university of Gotland, Sweden